Ampelopsin A is a resveratrol dimer found in Ampelopsis glandulosa var. hancei (formerly A. brevipedunculata var. hancei).

References

External links 
 kanaya.naist.jp/knapsack_jsp

Resveratrol oligomers
Stilbenoid dimers
Ampelopsis